Gustaf Adolf Britsch (11 August 1879 – 27 October 1923) was an early 20th-century German art theorist and the founder of Gustaf Britsch Institute in Starnberg, Germany.

Life
Gustaf Britsch was born into a middle-class Swabian family of teachers. He left his family early. He first studied architecture at the University of Stuttgart and worked as an architect in Stuttgart. Then he enrolled in 1906 at the Munich University of Philosophy and studied with Hans Cornelius and Theodor Lipps. He created theories to the understanding of art by early 1907, which were received by Adolf von Hildebrand and Konrad Fiedler. In 1909 he founded in Florence the "Institute of Theoretical and Applied Art Studies". In 1910, he was encouraged by Cornelius to publish his theories. He moved back to Munich in 1911 and in 1912 opened the Institute of Theoretical and Applied Arts Science again on Theresa Street in Schwabing. In 1913 he spoke at the Congress of Aesthetics and General Art Studies in Berlin. Together with his student Egon Kornmann he represented a highly regarded school of thought about children's artistic development, which found its way into art education programs in Germany. These theories were also contradictory to others, such as Richard Mund.

After Britschs' death, Kornmannn continued the Gustaf Britsch Institute in Starnberg. He also married Britschs' widow Louise, and clarified with her Britschs' designs and theories. So the Starnberger Kornmann-Britsch-circle (also Britsch-Kormann School) was founded, which employed art teacher Hans Herrmann. Kornmann was editor in the 1930s of the magazine The Shape.

Gustaf Britsch Institute
The Gustaf Britsch Institute for Art Research (also known as: Institute of Theoretical and Applied Arts Science; School of Fine Arts Starnberg; private art school Britsch-Kornmann; Gustaf Britsch Institute for comparative viewing art) existed from 1912 in Munich and then from about 1920 to about 1967 in a fashionable villa on Prinzenweg 13 in Starnberg, headed by Egon and Louise Kornmann.

Numerous international artists and art teachers were trained and employed for decades, such as:
 1912–1915 Arnold Clementschitsch
 1920 Fritz von Graevenitz
 1921/1925 Hermann Mayrhofer
 1925 Martin Seitz (Schüler von Josef Wackerle)
 1925–1929 Gerhard Gollwitzer
 1926 Rudolf Conrad Erich Allwardt
 1934 Irina Alexandrowna Borchman
 1939 Richard Lackner
 1943 Hans Grünseis

Works
Britsch published art theoretical essays, which were created in part by Gustaf Britsch Institute Starnberg as teaching material:

 Gustaf Britsch: Theory of Fine Art (edited by Egon Kornmann), 1926 
 Gustaf Britsch: Theory of Fine Arts. 4 Edition, Verlag Henn, Ratingen 1966

Literature
 Otfried Contactor: Britsch and Kornmann. Quellenkundliche studies on the theory of the visual arts; Königshausen and Neumann. Würzburg, 1993.  
 Gustaf Britsch: Fonts. Fragments on art theory in the early 20th Century. In 1981.  . 
 Egon Kornmann: Britsch, Gustav Adolf. In: New German Biography (NDB). Volume 2, Duncker & Humblot, Berlin 1955, p 618 ( digitized ).

Notes

References

Further reading
 Marie-Luise Dietl: Children painting: To use the color at the end of primary school. Waxmann, 2004.  . (P. 48-55) 
 Egon Kornmann (ed.): Beginnings of new youth art. Original stocks folk art from the German-language area (certificates German Folk Art Issue 3, published by Gustaf Britsch Institute) Starnberg 1927 
 Egon Kornmann: Images of the Landscape From the 16th and 17th Century. Max Niehans Verlag, Zurich 1945 
 Egon Kornmann: The theory of Gustaf Britsch as the foundation of art education. Düsseldorf, Schwann, 1948. (From the German will to art education; 3) 
 Egon Kornmann: On the legality and the value of children's drawings. 3 Ed, Aloys Henn Publisher, Ratingen 1953 
 Egon Kornmann: art in life. Collected Essays. Edited by Hans Herrmann. Aloys Henn, Ratingen 1954 
 Egon Kornmann: basic principles of artistic design. Introduction to the theory of art by Gustaf Britsch. Henn, Ratingen 1962
 Egon Kornmann: To evaluate by hand drawings. (Information of Gustaf Britsch Institute for Art Research. Book I. Printed as manuscript for the circle of the Institute) Gustaf Britsch Institute, Starnberg, 1929.
 Luise Kornmann: the life and work of Gustaf Britsch. Ratingen 1952 
 Lilo Prince Ramdohr: Friendships in the White Rose. History Workshop Neuhausen, Munich 1995. 

1879 births
1923 deaths
German art historians
University of Stuttgart alumni
German male non-fiction writers